The Dobrićevo Monastery is a Serbian Orthodox monastery  built in the first half of the 13th century in the Kingdom of Serbia (modern-day Republic of Srpska, Bosnia and Herzegovina). The building was originally built by the river Trebišnjica and moved in 1964 to the village Orah in the municipality of Bileća because its original location was flooded after hydro power plant near Bileća was completed in 1965.

History 
The monastery was built on the foundations of earlier Christian basilica which was, according to the local legend, built by Constantine the Great and Helena. Slava of Dobrićevo Monastery is Presentation of Mary. The legend says that narthex was built after the main church building by members of the Aleksić family whose descendants still lived in nearby Oputna Rudina village at the beginning of the 20th century.

During its history the monastery was destroyed or damaged many times. In 1672 it was burnt by the Ottomans. Ottomans again razed this monastery in 1687, after they were defeated and expelled from Herceg Novi. During the Herzegovina Uprising (1875–78) the monastery was again destroyed and robbed.

On 5 August 1914 the monastery was seriously damaged by the soldiers of Austria-Hungary who put straw inside the church and burned it in order to destroy the frescoes. On that occasion many books and relics in the church were destroyed too, while only a part was saved by the monks. Near Dobrićevo Monastery was Kosijerevo Monastery, on another side of river Trebišnjica which today belongs to Montenegro. Like Dobrićevo, Kosijerevo monastery has also been moved to another location, to Petrovići village, near Nikšić in the region of Banjani tribe.

The Dobrićevo Monastery was designated as a National Monument of Bosnia and Herzegovina in 2006.

See also 
List of Serb Orthodox monasteries

References

Further reading 
 

13th-century Serbian Orthodox church buildings
Serbian Orthodox monasteries in Bosnia and Herzegovina
1232 establishments in Europe
National Monuments of Bosnia and Herzegovina
Bileća
Medieval Serbian Orthodox monasteries
13th-century establishments in Bosnia and Herzegovina
Buildings and structures in Republika Srpska